Altınkaya (literally "golden rock" or "golden boulder") is a Turkish place name that may refer to:

 Altınkaya, Aksaray, a village in the district of Aksaray, Aksaray Province
 Altınkaya, Manavgat, a village in the district of Manavgat, Antalya Province
 Altınkaya, Tercan
 Altınkaya, Vezirköprü, a village in the district of Vezirköprü, Samsun Province
 Altınkaya Dam